Achille Chainaye (26 August 1862 – 20 December 1915) was a Belgian sculptor.

He was born in Liège. After moving to Brussels to study at the Académie Royale des Beaux-Arts he became a member of the Groupe des XX. He turned to journalism and went to London to work, where he died.

Notes and references

Source
  RKD.nl 
 Wallonie-en-ligne.net: Achille Chainaye 

Belgian sculptors
1862 births
1915 deaths
Artists from Liège
Belgian expatriates in England
19th-century Belgian journalists
Male journalists
Académie Royale des Beaux-Arts alumni
20th-century Belgian journalists